Tucson Lesbian and Gay Alliance, commonly known as Tucson Pride, is an American LGBT pride organization based in Tucson, Arizona.

History
Founded in 1977, Tucson Pride claims to be Arizona's first and oldest LGBTQ organization. It was founded in the aftermath of the 1976 murder of Richard Heakin. Heakin, who lived in Nebraska, visited a friend in Tucson and was beaten to death by four teenagers while exiting the Stonewall Tavern bar. The attackers were subsequently tried as juveniles, and sentenced to probation. Heakin’s murder became a motivation behind the foundation of Tucson Pride.

Tucson Pride first hosted an LGBTQ community event, the Gay Pride Festival & Memorial Picnic, at Himmel Park on June 26, 1977, also the National Gay Pride Day that year.

Administration
Tucson Pride is a non-profit organization. All members of the Board of Directors for Tucson Pride, as well as its committees, serve on a strictly volunteer basis. No member receives any payment, financial or otherwise, for serving. There are currently 10 members serving on the Board of Directors.

The Tucson Pride events "Pride on Parade" and "Pride in the Desert" are funded by a combination of community fundraising by the pride committee, corporate sponsorship's, vendor fees and donations collected from the participants at the festival.

Tucson Pride is a member of CAPI (Consolidated Association of Prides, Inc.) and Interpride.

See also

 LGBT community
 LGBT rights in Arizona
 Same-sex marriage in Arizona

References

External links
 Official website
 http://www.capride.org/ — CAPI

LGBT culture in Arizona
Culture of Tucson, Arizona
Pride parades in the United States
Non-profit organizations based in Arizona
Organizations based in Tucson, Arizona
Organizations established in 1976